Eqbal-e Gharbi Rural District is a rural district (dehestan) in the Central District of Qazvin County, Qazvin Province, Iran. At the 2006 census, its population was 37,488, in 8,940 families.  The rural district has 50 villages.

References 

Rural Districts of Qazvin Province
Qazvin County